Brocchinia azorica is a species of sea snail, a marine gastropod mollusk in the family Cancellariidae, the nutmeg snails.

Description

Distribution
This marine species occurs off the Azores.

References

 Bouchet, P. & Warén, A., 1985. Revision of the northeast Atlantic bathyal and abyssal Neogastropoda excluding Turridae (Mollusca, Gastropoda). Bollettino Malacologico: 120–296, sér. Suppl.1

External links
  Serge GOFAS, Ángel A. LUQUE, Joan Daniel OLIVER,José TEMPLADO & Alberto SERRA (2021) - The Mollusca of Galicia Bank (NE Atlantic Ocean); European Journal of Taxonomy 785: 1–114
 MNHN, Paris: holotype

Cancellariidae
Gastropods described in 1985
Molluscs of the Atlantic Ocean
Molluscs of the Azores